Earl Victor Moseley (September 7, 1887 – July 1, 1963) was a pitcher who played for the Boston Red Sox (1913), Indianapolis Hoosiers / Newark Pepper (1914–1915) and Cincinnati Reds (1916). Moseley batted and threw right-handed. He was born in Middleburg Heights, Ohio.

Moseley made his majors debut in 1913 with the Boston Red Sox and went 8–5. The next year, he jumped to the Federal League and won 19 and 15 in two seasons for the Indianapolis/Newark franchises, leading the league with a 1.91 earned run average in 1915 over Eddie Plank (2.08) and Mordecai Brown (2.09). Bothered by arm problems, he played his final season with the Cincinnati Reds in 1916.

In a four-season career, Moseley posted a 49–48 record with a 3.01 ERA and 469 strikeouts in 855-2/3 innings pitched. Moseley died in Alliance, Ohio, at the age of 75.

See also
List of Major League Baseball annual ERA leaders

External links

Baseball Almanac
Retrosheet

1887 births
1963 deaths
People from Middleburg Heights, Ohio
Boston Red Sox players
Cincinnati Reds players
Indianapolis Hoosiers players
Newark Peppers players
Major League Baseball pitchers
Baseball players from Ohio
East Liverpool Potters (baseball) players
Wheeling Stogies players
Youngstown Steelmen players
Beaumont Oilers players
Akron Buckeyes players
Sportspeople from Cuyahoga County, Ohio